The Pacific Rim International School (PRINTS) is an independent school for all grades of pre-collegiate education located in San Mateo, California and Emeryville, California in the United States.  The school is trilingual, educating students in English, Mandarin, and Japanese.

References

External links
Official website

Education in San Mateo County, California
Educational institutions established in 1989
Emeryville, California
Private high schools in California
Private middle schools in California
Private elementary schools in California
1989 establishments in California